Night of the Big Heat is a 1967 British science fiction film released by Planet Film Productions. Based on the 1959 novel of the same name by John Lymington, the film was directed by Terence Fisher, and starred Patrick Allen, Christopher Lee, Peter Cushing and Jane Merrow.

The film was released theatrically in the United States in the winter of 1971 by Maron Films as Island of the Burning Damned where it was paired up on a nationwide double bill with Godzilla's Revenge, but the poster art confused it with Island of Terror from 1966 which also starred Peter Cushing. The title was changed years later to Island Of The Burning Doomed for American television.

Plot
Jeff and Frankie Callum run The Swan, an inn on the island of Fara, somewhere off the English coast. Jeff, a professional novelist, hires a secretary, but this turns out to be Angela Roberts, a younger woman with whom he had an affair some time before, and who has come to the island with the intent of luring Jeff away from his wife, or at least causing trouble in their marriage. The Callums moved to Fara so that Jeff could escape Angela's amorous advances, although as far as Frankie knows, it was only to escape the tedium of life on the mainland.

Not helping matters is the fact that despite it being the middle of winter, Fara is experiencing a stifling and inexplicable heat wave, with temperatures rising rapidly. It has become so hot that cars stall, beer bottles shatter, televisions explode, and telephones have ceased to work.

Into this tense situation comes Godfrey Hanson, a mysterious scientist from the mainland, who rents a room at The Swan. Hanson spends his time exploring the island, setting up motion-sensitive cameras and taking soil samples. The locals, including the Callums, find this suspicious, especially since quite a lot more is happening on Fara than just the heat and Hanson's snooping.

A tramp is burned to death in a cave by something emitting a high-pitched whirring sound. Later, a farmer claims his sheep are all dead. Hanson examines the dead sheep and finds their corpses are badly burned, whilst Swan regular Bob Hayward is attacked by something on the road while driving into the village. He crashes after being blinded by a bright light, which also creates enough heat to ignite the car's petrol tank. Meanwhile, pub regular Tinker, losing his mind because of the heat, attempts to attack Angela whilst she's working, but when she hits him over the head with an ashtray, he flees and ends up burned to death as well. Jeff finally confronts Hanson and demands answers from him. According to the scientist, Fara is the site of an invasion by extraterrestrials, whose extremely high temperature burns any living creature that gets too close to them.

Jeff and Hanson resolve to stop the aliens with the help of local physician Dr. Stone, but when Stone tries to get to Fara's meteorological station so he can alert the mainland of the invasion, he is waylaid by the aliens and killed. Hanson tries next, but witnesses the death of Stella Hayward, Bob's wife, and realises the aliens are attracted to light. At the weather station, he learns from meteorologist Ken Stanley and his colleague Foster that the aliens have already destroyed all their communications equipment, making it impossible to call for help.

Quickly formulating a plan, Hanson is joined by Jeff, Frankie and Angela at the radar station. He and Foster will set fire to bales of hay in a field, attracting the aliens, and then lob dynamite into the field, hopefully destroying them, whilst the others signal for help with flare pistols.

This plan quickly fails, and Foster and then Hanson are both killed. Surrounded by the deadly aliens, the situation looks hopeless when a sudden thunderstorm breaks. Unexpectedly, the rain brings death to the aliens, and Jeff, Frankie, Angela and Ken all survive.

Cast

 Christopher Lee as Professor Godfrey Hanson
 Patrick Allen as Jeff Callum
 Peter Cushing as Dr. Vernon Stone
 Sarah Lawson as Frankie Callum
 Jane Merrow as Angela Roberts
 William Lucas as Ken Stanley
 Percy Herbert as Gerald Foster
 Kenneth Cope as Tinker Mason
 Thomas Heathcote as Bob Hayward
 Anna Turner as Stella Hayward
 Jack Bligh as Ben Siddle
 Sydney Bromley as Old Tramp

Production
The novel on which the film is based had been adapted for British television by ITV in 1960. It was intended to use the TV script with some embellishing, but it required several changes and writers Pip and Jane Baker were hired to work on it. Filming took place at Pinewood Studios, whilst exteriors for the pub around which the action takes place were filmed at The Swan Inn in Milton Keynes Village, which is surrounded by housing rather than the fields seen in the film. The opening shots of what is referred to in the film as the island's meteorological station are actually of the transmitter station at Portland Bill, Dorset.

References

External links 

 

1967 films
1967 horror films
1960s science fiction horror films
Adultery in films
Alien invasions in films
British science fiction horror films
Films about writers
Films based on science fiction novels
Films directed by Terence Fisher
Films scored by Malcolm Lockyer
Films set in England
Films set in Scotland
Films set on islands
Films shot at Pinewood Studios
Films with screenplays by Pip and Jane Baker
1960s English-language films
1960s British films